The Computing Technology Industry Association, more commonly known as CompTIA, is an American non-profit trade association that issues professional certifications for the information technology (IT) industry. It is considered one of the IT industry's top trade associations. 

Based in Downers Grove, Illinois, CompTIA issues vendor-neutral professional certifications in over 120 countries. The organization releases industry studies to track industry trends and changes. Over 2.2 million people have earned CompTIA certifications since the association was established.

History
CompTIA was created in 1982 as the Association of Better Computer Dealers (ABCD). ABCD later changed its name to the Computing Technology Industry Association.

In 2010, CompTIA moved its headquarters into a new office space in a facility in Downers Grove, Illinois.

The CompTIA portal moved to a hybrid version of the open-access model in April 2014 with exclusive content for dues-paying members. The move expanded the organization's reach to engage a broader, more diverse set of members, and within a year, CompTIA's membership grew from 2,050 members to more than 50,000 in 2015. By the close of 2016, the organization boasted more than 100,000 members worldwide.

Skillsboost, CompTIA's online resource for schools, was launched in June 2015. It contained resources for students, parents and teachers to promote the importance of computer skills. CompTIA held its first annual ChannelCon Vendor Summit in 2015. The Vendor Summit is exclusive to people attending ChannelCon, the industry's premier conference for collaboration, education and networking. It addresses issues within the IT industry.

In January 2017, CompTIA launched an IT professional association built on its acquisition of the Association of Information Technology Professionals.

Trustmarks
CompTIA offers trustmarks to businesses to certify their security capabilities and credentials.

The CompTIA Security Trustmark+ is based on the NIST Cybersecurity Framework and demonstrates compliance with key industry regulations such as PCI-DSS, SSAE-16, HIPAA, and others reliant on the NIST Framework. It is based on a third-party assessment of security policies, procedures and operations.

CompTIA offered additional trustmarks, a Managed Services Trustmark and Managed Print Trustmark, that were retired on Sept. 30, 2021.

Certifications
CompTIA administers its vendor-neutral certification exams through Pearson VUE testing centers. (Note: For A+ up through CASP+ one can renew or extend their certification by satisfying in these cases 20 to 75 CEUs a.k.a. "Continuing Education Units,"  over the three-year period.)

Basic certifications
The CompTIA IT Fundamentals+ certification covers foundational IT concepts, basic IT literacy, and terminology and concepts of the IT industry. It is considered the first step toward the A+ certification.

CompTIA also offers the Cloud Essentials certification as a pathway to its Cloud+ credential.

Professional level certifications

A+: earned accreditation from the American National Standards Institute (ANSI) in 2008. A+ certification represents entry-level competency as a computer technician and is a vendor neutral certification that covers various technologies and operating systems. By 2014, over one million people worldwide had earned A+ certification. The certification expires 3 years after obtainment. Certification prior to January 1, 2011, is considered good-for-life (GFL) and does not expire.
Cloud+: released in October 2013 including both cloud computing and virtualization. It is accredited by ANSI and maps to DOD 8570 Standards. It expires in 3 years.
CySA+: Cybersecurity Analyst; released in February 2017. The certification focuses on cyber-threat detection tools and analysis to identify vulnerabilities and risks. CSA+ was accredited by ANSI. In January 2018, the certification was renamed from CSA+ to CySA+ as a result of a trademark dispute. It expires in 3 years.
Data+: released in February 2022.  This certification focuses on data mining, manipulating data, visualizing & reporting data, statistical methods, and governance.
Linux+: A single exam known as XK0-004 that is renewable through the CE program, the certification covers Linux operating systems, from their installation and use to the basics of applicable free software and open source licenses. Was formerly a two-part exam LX0-103 and LX0-104 in partnership with Linux Professional Institute. 
Network+: accredited by ANSI in 2008. The entry-level certification is used to measure skill as a network technician. It expires in 3 years. Certification prior to January 1, 2011, is considered good-for-life (GFL) and does not expire.
PenTest+: intermediate-level certification focusing on penetration testing. Released July 31, 2018, the PenTest+ covers risk analysis, threat detection, and penetration testing and ethical hacking tools and methodologies. PenTest+ is ANSI and ISO 17024 accredited and currently aligns with the DOD 8570 standard. It expires in 3 years.    Project+: In 2001, CompTIA acquired the Project+  project management certification program from Gartner. The program, previously called "IT Project+", was updated in 2003.Security+: also earned its ANSI accreditation in 2008. Security+ is an entry-level vendor-neutral security certification that builds off of the network security knowledge covered by the Network+ certification. It expires in 3 years. Certification prior to January 1, 2011, is considered good-for-life (GFL) and does not expire.Server+: focuses on server-specific hardware and operating systems, IT environments, disaster recovery and business continuity. It was developed in 2001, with updates released in 2005, 2009, 2018, and 2021.

Master level certificationCompTIA Advanced Security Practitioner (CASP+)''' is the highest level certification in CompTIA's cybersecurity pathway after Security+, CySA+, and PenTest+. The CASP+ certification was accredited by the International Organization for Standardization (ISO) and the American National Standards Institute (ANSI) on December 13, 2011. The CASP+ exam will certify that the successful candidate has the technical knowledge and skills required to conceptualize, design, and engineer secure solutions across complex enterprise environments. In March 2013, the U.S. Department of Defense approved the certification as a baseline certification accepted for Information Assurance Technical Level III, IS Manager Level II and IA Systems Architect and Engineer Levels I and II.

Specialty certifications
"Certified Document Imaging Architect", or "CDIA+", is a certification for competency in document imaging, document management, and enterprise content management.

The "Certified Technical Trainer" or "CTT+" certification is a vendor-neutral certification that is applicable to training professionals in all industries. Originally administered in 2001 through The Chauncey Institute, the CTT program was acquired by CompTIA and renamed as CTT+. It was created through a collaboration of the Information Technology Training Association, Inc. (ITTA) and the Computer Education Management Association (CedMA). The CTT+ certification will be permanently retired without replacement on December 31, 2023.  Anyone with the CTT+ certification will remain certified after the retirement date. 

The CompTIA "Healthcare IT Technician" certificate focused on IT in the healthcare industry and was aimed at IT professionals who install and maintain electronic health record systems. It was retired in 2017.

Stackable certifications
In January 2018, CompTIA released stackable certifications:

CompTIA Infrastructure Career Pathway
 Specialist
 CompTIA IT Operations Specialist (A+/Network+)
 CompTIA Systems Support Specialist (A+/Linux+)
 Professional
CompTIA Cloud Admin Professional (Network+/Cloud+)
CompTIA Network Infrastructure Professional (Network+/Server+)
CompTIA Linux Network Professional (Network+/Linux+)

CompTIA Cybersecurity Career Pathway
Specialist
CompTIA Secure Infrastructure Specialist (A+/Network+/Security+)
Professional
 CompTIA Secure Cloud Professional (Security+/Cloud+)
 CompTIA Security Analytics Professional (Security+/CySA+)
 CompTIA Network Vulnerability Assessment Professional (Security+/PenTest+)
 CompTIA Network Security Professional (Security+/PenTest+/CySA+)
Expert
CompTIA Security Analytics Expert (Security+/CySA+/CASP+)
CompTIA Security Infrastructure Expert (Security+/CySA+/PenTest+/CASP+)

Right to Repair
CompTIA initially lobbied against the right to repair. On February 21, 2020, CompTIA posted stated that as of February 3, 2020, "CompTIA permanently stepped back from all lobbying activity related to right to repair legislation."

Philanthropy
CompTIA established a 501(c)(3) nonprofit organization called Creating IT Futures.

Certification expiration
Previously, CompTIA marketed its flagship A+, Network+, and Security+ certifications as being valid for a lifetime. In January 2011, CompTIA changed the status of these certifications so that they would expire every three years. Under this proposal, certified individuals would have to re-certify for the exams or pay a yearly maintenance fee for a CEU (Continuing Education Units) system. CompTIA modified the guidelines so that only certificates received after January 1, 2011, would need to be renewed every three years and would require documented continuing education hours. The un-expirable certificates, issued before 2011, are officially called Good-for-Life, and getting a more updated (and expirable) certification does not replace the Good-for-Life one – the professional can have both.

See also
Strata Exam
Computer repair technician
List of computer security certifications

References

External links 
 

Trade associations based in the United States
Information technology lobbying organizations
Technology trade associations
Mass media companies